72 episodes of the History Channel television series Top Gear were broadcast. The show was presented by Tanner Foust, Adam Ferrara, Rutledge Wood, and The Stig.

Series overview

Season 1 (2010–11)

Season 2 (2011–12)

Season 3 (2012–13)

Season 4 (2013)

Season 5 (2014)

Season 6 (2016)

References

External links
List of Episodes on History.com

Lists of American non-fiction television series episodes
Episodes